Jhenaidah-4 is a constituency represented in the Jatiya Sangsad (National Parliament) of Bangladesh since 2014 by Anwarul Azim Anar of the Awami League.

Boundaries 
The constituency encompasses Kaliganj Upazila and four union parishads of Jhenaidah Sadar Upazila: Fursandi, Ghorshal, Moharajpur, and Naldanga.

History 
The constituency was created in 1984 from the Jessore-3 constituency when the former Jessore District was split into four districts: Jhenaidah, Jessore, Magura, and Narail.

Members of Parliament

Elections

Elections in the 2010s

Elections in the 2000s

Elections in the 1990s

References

External links
 

Parliamentary constituencies in Bangladesh
Jhenaidah District